Chris Hurt (born July 5, 1972) is an American politician who serves in the Tennessee House of Representatives. A Republican, he represents District 82, which contains parts of Lauderdale, Haywood, and Crockett counties.

Biography
Chris Hurt attended Halls High School in Halls, Tennessee, and received a Bachelor of Science from Lambuth University. He was a teacher and the head football coach at Halls High School from 2000 to 2014. He is also a real estate broker.

Hurt was first elected to the Tennessee House of Representatives in 2018. He serves on the Commerce Committee, Business Subcommittee, Education Committee, Higher Education Subcommittee, Transportation Committee, and Infrastructure Subcommittee.

Political positions
Hurt self-identifies as a conservative Republican. He self identifies as "100% pro-life". He opposes same-sex marriage, and supports gun rights. He opposes illegal immigration and sanctuary cities.

In February 2022, Hurt introduced a bill, HB 254, that would designate "a person who has been issued an enhanced handgun carry permit" as a member of law enforcement. A similar bill, SB 2523, was introduced in the state senate by Joey Hensley. A Hensley spokesperson said the bill would only allow someone to carry a gun where the police can. The Tennessee State Lodge for the Fraternal Order of Police said that it is "adamantly opposed" to the bill.

Personal life
Hurt is married to Dawn Hurt, and they have five children. He attends First Baptist Church in Halls.

References

1972 births
Republican Party members of the Tennessee House of Representatives
People from Halls, Tennessee
Lambuth University alumni
21st-century American politicians
Living people